Mithri is a village in Kot Diji taluka, Khairpur Mirs district, Sindh, Pakistan. It is situated along the Muhabat Waah canal and the national highway connecting Khairpur to Kot Diji.

The population of Mithri is about 5,000. Most are engaged in farming fields, with the second largest group  in government services. Most of the civil servants work in the education  department, while a few are engineers and doctors. Rid is the main caste in the majority here and other castes are Hajano, Sanjrani, Shahani, Lashari, Laghari, Syed, Sheikh and Hindu families and some other Baloch castes.

References

Populated places in Khairpur District